Sir Hector Maclean may refer to:
Sir Hector Maclean, 2nd Baronet (c.1620-1651), 18th Clan Chief of Clan Maclean
Sir Hector Maclean, 5th Baronet (c.1700-1750/1751), 21st Clan Chief of Clan Maclean
Sir Hector Maclean, 7th Baronet (1783 - 1818), 23rd Clan Chief of Clan Maclean

See also
Hector Maclean (disambiguation)